John de Bermingham (died 1547) was an Anglo-Irish lord.

John succeeded upon the death of his father, Meiler. He was the ninth lord since the town's foundation in the late 1230s. During his lifetime, Athenry began to decline in response to warfare with Clanricarde to the south-east, the Ó Ceallaigh of Uí Maine to the east, and the Ó Conchobhairs and Mac Diarmadas of Síol Muiredaig and Moylurg. Its trade had been secondary to Galway, yet as late as 1540 the town was well-populated and featuring new buildings, indicating that John's era enjoyed some prosperity.

Contemporary Irish annals such as the Annals of Loch Cé (and their successor, the Annals of the Four Masters), only give allusive references to events in the area, and few directly concerning de Bermingham himself.

A notable feature of his lordship is the North Gate of Athenry, which is believed to have been built in his time. It is now the only surviving town gate, though over two-thirds of the wall, enclosing at least one hundred and fifty acres, survive.

References
 History of Galway, James Hardiman, Galway, 1820
 The Abbey of Athenry, Martin J. Blake, Journal of the Galway Archaeological and Historical Society, volume II, part ii, 1902
 The Birmingham family of Athenry, H.T. Knox, J.G.A.H.S., volume ten, numbers iii and iv, 1916-17.
 Remarks on the walls and church of Athenry, Charles Mac Neill, J.G.A.H.S., volume 11, numbers iii and iv, 1921
 Punann Arsa:The Story of Athenry, County Galway, Martin Finnerty, Ballinasloe, 1951.
 Athenry:A Medieval Irish Town, Etienne Rynne, Athenry Historical Society, Athenry, 1992

People from County Galway
Barons Athenry
John
1547 deaths